B.P. Koirala Institute of Health Sciences (BPKIHS), is a Nepalese autonomous health sciences university. It is located in the sub-metropolitan city of Dharan in Sunsari District. The Institute is a Nepal-India cooperation. The Institute serves the health education needs of the eastern region of Nepal at primary, secondary and tertiary levels.

The Institute comprises four colleges: the Faculty of Medicine, the College of Dental Surgery, the College of Nursing, and the School of Public Health and Community Medicine. The Institute also operates a 700-bed Teaching Hospital, offering postgraduate, undergraduate and university certificate programs. The Institute grants Bachelor's, Master's, Doctoral degrees like Doctorate of Medicine (DM) , and several other certificates. The MBBS program began on March 10, 1994, while the postgraduate programs began in 1999.

History
Established, the Institute became an Autonomous Health Sciences University on October 28, 1998.

The Institute was established on January 18, 1993.

The Institute was named after the late former Prime Minister of Nepal Bishweshwar Prasad Koirala.

The Institute took over the management of the 150-bed Eastern Regional Hospital, a Public Hospital, in 1993. The University raised the number of beds to 700 and added a coronary care unit and intensive care unit facilities, as well as a critical care area, and observational beds. MRI, CT-scan, emergency laboratory, C-arm, mobile X-ray are among the facilities. A sterilization section and operation theatres with recovery room facilities were also added.

The Bachelor of Medicine, Bachelor of Surgery (MBBS) programme of BPKIHS started in 1993 with the course duration of 4.5 years. It is listed in the World Directory of Medical Schools, and the MBBS qualification is recognized by the Medical Council of India.

and was transformed into an Autonomous Health Sciences University in 1998. In 2010, the foundation stone was laid for a new college block, funded by the Government of India.

Medical Facilities 
A Cath lab from Philips (Allura FC) provides coronary catheterization and angiography. Logistics and training were provided with the support of Geneva University.

Dentistry 
The institute has a separate College of Dental Surgery that accepts 60 students for the Bachelor of Dental Surgery program every year through competitive entrance examinations. A total of nine separate Dental Departments function smoothly in the university premises that are as follows:

 Department of Oral Medicine and Radiology
 Department of Oral and Maxillofacial Surgery
 Department of Prosthodontics
 Department of Pedodontics and Preventive Dentistry
 Department of Orthodontics and Dentofacial Orthopedics
 Department of Public Health Dentistry
 Department of Periodontology and Implant Dentistry
 Department of Conservative Dentistry and Endodontics
 Department of Oral Pathology and Microbiology

A Postgraduate degree in Dentistry, MDS in those disciplines are available.

Hospital Services 
The services offered at the university hospital include:

 In-patient services
 Emergency Hospital Services
 DOTS TB Clinic (expanded as Directly Observed Treatment Short course Tuberculosis Clinic)
 Public Health and Social Services
 Institutional Practice
 Radiology and Laboratory Services
 OT (operating theater) and Minor Procedure Services
 OPD (Outpatient Department) Services

Notables 
 Ramesh Bijlani, former Professor of Physiology at AIIMS
 Tirath Das Dogra, former Director of AIIMS and an authority on forensic medicine

References

External links
Official website
B.P.Koirala Institute of Health sciences
BPKIHS Guidance 

Medical colleges in Nepal
1993 establishments in Nepal